The National Security Council is the advisory and coordinating body of the Government for national defence, security system, emergency response system and other issues of national security. Prime Minister is ex officio president of the Council.

In the case of war or emergency, the Council becomes National Executive Staff of Defence (Slovenian: Državni operativni štab za obrambo).

National Centre for Crisis Management of the Republic of Slovenia (within Ministry of Defence) provides administrative and technical support for the Council, Secretariat and Secretariat Executive Group.

Members 
On 16 March 2020 14th Government changed Decree on National Security Council (Odlok o Svetu za nacionalno varnost) and excluded Director of Slovenian Intelligence and Security Agency from the Council. Ministers of Defence, Infrastructure, Justice are no longer members ex officio. Deputy Prime Minister are now members ex officio. Even though Minister of Defence is no longer member of the Council, current minister Matej Tonin is member as he is also a Deputy Prime Minister. Composition of the Secretariat changed as well. State secretaries in the ministries of the Interior, Defence, Finance, Justice and Infrastructure, Director of the Information Security Administration, Director of the Government Office for the Protection of Classified Information, Director of the Government Office of Legislation  and national coordinators for the Prevention of Terrorism and Violent Extremism and for the Prevention of Radicalization are no longer members. Secretariat Executive Group was abolished as well.

Secretariat of the Council 
Secretariat coordinates actions of the Council and preparations for its sessions.

References 

National security in Slovenia